Elly Randriamampionona (born 20 July 1997) is a Malagasy basketball player for COSPN on loan from GNBC and for .

Career
Randriamampionona started playing at a young age with Sporting Club Antsiranana before joining ASCB Boeny in 2014. In 2017, he won the Malagasy N1A and the President's Cup. In 2018, Randriamampionona signed with GNBC. He won the 2019 championship with the team and qualified for the BAL Qualifying Tournaments. There, he helped his team qualify for the first-ever Basketball Africa League (BAL) season.

In October 2022, he played on loan for COSPN in the 2023 BAL qualification.

National team career
Randriamampionona plays for the Madagascar senior national team. He has been a member of the U15, U18 and U20 teams as well.

3x3 basketball 
Randriamampionona has represented Madagascar in 3x3 basketball. On December 4, he won gold at the 2022 FIBA 3x3 Africa Cup and was named MVP as well after scoring a total of 34 points over the tournament.

BAL career statistics

|-
| style="text-align:left;"|2021
| style="text-align:left;"|GNBC
| 3 || 3 || 30.9 || .471 || .476 || .900 || 3.3 || 2.3 || 1.3 || .0 || 17.0
|-
|- class="sortbottom"
| style="text-align:center;" colspan="2"|Career
| 3 || 3 || 30.9 || .471 || .476 || .900 || 3.3 || 2.3 || 1.3 || .0 || 17.0

Personal
Elly is the son of former basketball players Secren Antsiranana and Sirama Ambilobe.

References

1997 births
Living people
GNBC basketball players
Malagasy men's basketball players
Shooting guards